Cornwall was launched in Whitby in 1798 or 1799 as a West Indiaman. Between 1817 and 1819 she made two voyages to Bengal, sailing under a licence from the British East India Company (EIC). She made a third voyage, this time in 1825, to Bombay. The last readily accessible reports of her movements have her returning to Liverpool from Demerara in early 1827.

Career
Cornwall first appeared in Lloyd's Register (LR) in 1800. In 1800 Lloyd's List reported that Cornwall, Campion, master, had arrived in Jamaica from Newcastle, having come via New York.

On 2 July 1812, as Cornwall, Campion, master, was on her way from Jamaica to Liverpool at  she came across an American brig with all her spars gone, except the bowsprit, and no one on board.

In 1813 the EIC had lost its monopoly on the trade between India and Britain. British ships were then free to sail to India or the Indian Ocean under a license from the EIC. 

On 30 April 1817 Cornwall, J.Oxley, master, sailed from England, bound for Fort William, India under a license from the EIC. She arrived at Bengal on 14 August and on 22 October sailed for Liverpool. On 2 April 1818 she arrived back at Liverpool.

Cornwall, Oxley, master, sailed again for Bengal on 1 June 1818. On 9 July she sailed from Madeira. She arrived in Bengal on 12 November. On 18 September 1819 Cornwall, Oxley, master, arrived in Liverpool. On the 14th she had grounded on Rush Shoal, near Blackwater, County Wexford, but was gotten off the next day. She had sailed from the Sand Heads on 28 March.

On 24 May 1823 Cornwall, Wright, master, put back into Demerara a few days after she had left for Liverpool. She had developed a leak. The source of the leak was discovered after she had unloaded about 120 packets. Three days later she was completing her reloading and was expected to sail again in a few days. It was believed that her cargo had not sustained any damage.

On 6 January 1825 Cornwall, Morrison, master, sailed from Liverpool for Bombay. She was again sailing under a license from the EIC. She arrived in Bombay on 26 May. On 3 July she put back into Bombay. She had left some days earlier but had encountered severe weather that started a leak. She had to discharge some of her cargo and it was expected that she would have to go into dock. She left St Helena on 28 October. On 13 November at  she spoke the whaler Ann. Cornwall arrived back in Liverpool on 18 December.

Fate
Cornwall was last listed in LR in the volume for 1826. (The volume for 1827 available online is missing the relevant pages.) She was listed in the Register of Shipping for a number of more years, but with data stale from 1826. Cornwall, Morrison, master, last appeared in the ship arrival and departure data in British newspapers as being in Demerara in early 1827.

Citations and references
Citations

References
 
 

1790s ships
Ships built in Whitby
Age of Sail merchant ships of England